Ivan Belošević (12 September 1909 – 7 October 1987), nicknamed Ivica, was a Croatian footballer. He played international football for both the Kingdom of Yugoslavia national football team and the Independent State of Croatia national football team.

Club career
He was born in Sušak, and started his career with Zagreb's HTŠK Grafičar before moving to HŠK Concordia. With Concordia he won the Royal Championship in 1932. Belošević moved to HŠK Građanski in 1937. He ended his career in 1941, when he became a manager. He died in Zagreb, aged 78.

International career
He made his debut for Yugoslavia in a June 1933 Balkan Cup match against Greece and earned a total of 11 caps scoring no goals. His final international was an October 1939  friendly against Germany. He  played three games for the unofficial Croatian national team representing the Banovina of Croatia in 1940.

References

External links
 
 
 
 

1909 births
1987 deaths
Footballers from Rijeka
Association football fullbacks
Yugoslav footballers
Yugoslavia international footballers
Croatian footballers
Croatia international footballers
Dual internationalists (football)
HŠK Građanski Zagreb players
HŠK Concordia players
Yugoslav First League players